Luigi Kuveiller (3 October 1927 – 10 January 2013) was an Italian cinematographer, best known for his collaboration with Elio Petri.

Born in Rome, the son of a craftsman - interior decorator, Kuveiller soon abandoned his studies and began working as an apprentice at Cinecittà in the troupe of cinematographer Filiberto Emmanuel for the film Redenzione (1943), directed by Marcello Albani. In the fifties Kuveiller started an important career as a camera operator, working among others with Aldo Scavarda in L'Avventura (1960) by Michelangelo Antonioni and with Aldo Tonti in the biblical Barabbas (1961).

Kuveiller made his debut as cinematographer in 1967, at the age of forty, with A ciascuno il suo, a film which marked the beginning of his critically appreciated artistic collaboration with the director Elio Petri. His credits also include films by Billy Wilder, Marco Bellocchio, Mario Monicelli, Andy Warhol, Marco Ferreri, Alberto Lattuada, Dario Argento, Damiano Damiani. After having achieved the best results of his career in the first half of the seventies, Kuveiller devoted himself mainly to  popular comedy, regularly working with Bruno Corbucci and Carlo Vanzina.

From the mid-eighties he began working for television, and from the mid-nineties most of his work was television-based.

References

External links 
 

1927 births
2013 deaths
Italian cinematographers
Film people from Rome